The FIBA Africa Championship 1995 took place in Algiers, Algeria from December 11 to December 18, 1995. The top country in this FIBA Africa Championship earned the berth allocated to Africa for the 1996 Summer Olympics in Atlanta. Angola won the tournament, the country's 4th consecutive African championship, by beating Senegal in the final.

Competing Nations
The following national teams competed:

Preliminary rounds

Group A

Day 1

Day 2

Day 3

Day 4

Day 5

Group B

Day 1

Day 2

Day 3

Knockout stage

Classification Stage

Final standings

Angola qualified for the 1996 Summer Olympics in Atlanta.

Awards

External links
 FIBA Archive

B
1995 in African basketball
B
AfroBasket
December 1995 sports events in Africa